A by-election was held for the South Australian House of Assembly seat of Florey on 4 September 1982. This was triggered by the resignation of former state Labor MHA Harold O'Neill. The seat had been retained by Labor since it was created and first contested at the 1970 state election.

Results
Labor easily retained the seat.

See also
List of South Australian House of Assembly by-elections

References

South Australian state by-elections
1982 elections in Australia
1980s in South Australia